The Berna 2 US is a truck model manufactured by the Swiss company Berna from 1957 onwards. The payload of 4.9 tonnes, it is a right hand driven truck. The Berna 2 US, military designation "Lastw m 4.0 t 4x2", has a total weight of 8800 kg, a structure with cab and bridge as well as an on-board voltage of 24 V. The 4-cylinder diesel engine with 5820 cm³ produces a power of 59 kW (80 hp). The Swiss Army used it since 1957. The Berna 2 US was also sold for civilian purposes.

A Berna 2-US truck is now in the museum in the Zeughaus Schaffhausen.

References
  Berna 2 US Lastw m 4,0 t 4x2 auf militaerfahrzeuge.ch
 Museum im Zeughaus Schaffhausen

Military trucks of Switzerland
Off-road vehicles
Military vehicles introduced in the 1950s